Attai is a village in western Eritrea.

Location
The town is located in Mogolo subregion in the Gash-Barka region. It is situated 4.1 miles from the district capital of Mogolo.

Nearby towns and villages include Hambok (7.4 nm), Mescul (5.7 nm), Aredda (5.1 nm), Chibabo (4.4 nm) and Abaredda (4.1 nm).

Villages in Eritrea